"The Housing Question" is an essay by Friedrich Engels that was published in 1872.

Content and analysis 
Engels wrote:
The expansion of the big modern cities gives the land in certain sections of them, particularly in those which are centrally situated, an artificial, often economically increasing, value; the buildings erected in those areas depress this value . . . because they no longer correspond to the changed circumstances. . . . The result is that the workers are forced out of the center of the town, toward the outskirts.

Jacobin wrote that this resonates with current developments where inner city buildings are threatened with demolition.

See also 
 Right to Buy

References 

Friedrich Engels
1872 essays